Pelican Island is a small private island located off the northeast coast of Antigua, at the eastern end of Mercers Creek Bay and immediately to the east of Crump Island.

Geography 
Pelican Island  has an area of about 1.3 km2. The island lies only about 137 metres from Antigua. This proximity also means that Antiguan infrastructures of power reach Pelican Island.

History 
The island was one of the Antiguan properties involved in the Allen Stanford case. The financier was said to have acquired the island, along with Guana Island in 2008 for $17 million, subsequently inflating its value by flipping. In 2012 The Telegraph included the island among "The world's best private islands for sale".

References

Private islands of Antigua and Barbuda